Abbad Jawad El Andaloussi is a Moroccan footballer who played for Morocco in the 1976 and 1978 African Cup of Nations. At club level he played for Wydad, Raja Casablanca, Saudi Arabia's Al-Shabab and Hong Kong's Tung Sing FC.

International career 
El Andaloussi played for Morocco in the 1976 and 1978 African Cup of Nations. He also played for the Morocco national football team in the 1982 FIFA World Cup qualification.

Managerial career
El Andaloussi began coaching the Laval Dynamites in the Canadian Professional Soccer League in 2003. In his debut season with Laval the team failed to qualify for the postseason for the first time in the club's history, missing the final playoff spot by one point. He resigned from his position as head coach at the conclusion of the season. He returned to the organization in 2006 and his signing was announced in a press conference. He brought in Arturo Cisneros Salas, Andrew Olivieri, Hicham Aâboubou, Rachid Madkour, and Abraham Francois. El Andaloussi had a successful season, with Laval finishing third in the National Division and making the postseason for the second year in a row for the franchise. Laval faced Toronto Croatia in the quarterfinals and were defeated 1–0.

References

External links 

1955 births
Living people
Footballers from Casablanca
Moroccan footballers
Moroccan expatriate footballers
Morocco international footballers
1976 African Cup of Nations players
1978 African Cup of Nations players
Africa Cup of Nations-winning players
Competitors at the 1979 Mediterranean Games
Mediterranean Games competitors for Morocco
Canadian Soccer League (1998–present) managers
Association football defenders
Moroccan football managers
Moroccan expatriate football managers
Botola players
Wydad AC players
Raja CA players
Al-Shabab FC (Riyadh) players
Saudi Professional League players
Expatriate footballers in Saudi Arabia
Moroccan expatriate sportspeople in Saudi Arabia
Expatriate footballers in Hong Kong
Moroccan expatriate sportspeople in Hong Kong
Moroccan expatriate sportspeople in Canada
Expatriate soccer managers in Canada